() (also called Tose Software) is a Japanese video game development company based in Kyoto. It is mostly known for developing Nintendo's Game & Watch Gallery series, various Dragon Ball games, as well as other Nintendo products. Tose has developed or co-developed over 1,000 games since the company's inception in 1979, but is virtually never credited in the games themselves (an exception to this is Game & Watch Gallery 4 and The Legendary Starfy series, as Tose shares the copyright with Nintendo). "We're always behind the scenes," said Masa Agarida, Vice President of Tose's U.S. division. "Our policy is not to have a vision. Instead, we follow our customer's visions. Most of the time we refuse to put our name on the games, not even staff names." As such, Tose has gained a reputation for being a "ghost developer."

History
Tose was established in November 1979 in Higashiyama-ku, Kyoto, as an independent entity from Toa Seiko Co. Ltd. In April 1984, the company began developing video games, and it started developing educational software a year later. It moved its head office to Otokuni-gun, Kyoto Prefecture in May 1986. Tose began developing software in April 1987. In July 1988, Tose moved its head office to Yamazaki, Kyoto. In May 1990, Tose began developing software for the Game Boy and the Super Famicom.

In August 1999, Tose was listed on the Osaka Securities Exchange 2nd Section and the Kyoto Stock Exchange. In October of that year, Tose's Kyoto Head office was opened at Shijo-Karasuma, which integrated its head office functions with the Karasuma CG Center. On 27 September 2000, Tose was listed on the Tokyo Stock Exchange 2nd Section. In August 2001, it was listed on the Tokyo Stock Exchange 1st Section and Osaka Securities Exchange 1st Section.

On 18 December 2007, Tose announced the leakage of its business information onto the Internet, which was discovered the day before. The leak included 10 pieces of information relating to customer names, development cases, development contents, development fees, and reception time.

On September 1, 2011, Tose announced the separation of its amusement machine development business from its second game development department (ゲーム事業部開発２部) into a separate amusement machine developer (AM開発部).

List of games developed by Tose
NOTE: Some of these titles are merely believed or assumed to be developed by Tose, due to information compiled by various amateur and professional journalists. Most have not been officially confirmed as Tose-developed products by any of the games' publishers, co-developers, nor Tose itself. Many of the games released by Bandai, Tomy Corporation, Jaleco, Taito, Namco, Tonkin House were developed by Tose.
See also :Category:Tose (company) games

Arcade
Vanguard (1981)
Vanguard II (1984)
Data Carddass Aikatsu Planet! (2020)

Family Computer/Nintendo Entertainment System
Exerion (1985)
Field Combat (1985)
Chubby Cherub (1985)
Ikki (1985)
M.U.S.C.L.E. (1985)
City Connection (1985)
Mississippi Satsujin Jiken (1986)
Mappy-Land (1986)
Choplifter (1986)
Dragon Power (1986)
Ninja Kid (1986)
Urusei Yatsura: Lum no Wedding Bell (1986)
Bases Loaded (1987)
Karaoke Studio (1987)
Lupin Sansei: Pandora no Isan (1987)
Uchūsen: Cosmo Carrier (1987)
Goal! (1988)
Bases Loaded II: Second Season (1988)
Racket Attack (1988)
Demon Sword (1988)
Dragon Ball: Daimaou Fukkatsu (1988)
Pinball Quest (1989)
Oishinbo: Kyukyoku no Menu 3bon Syoubu (1989)
Sakigake!! Otokojuku: Shippu Ichi Gou Sei (1989)
Famicom Jump: Hero Retsuden (1989)
Bandai Golf: Challenge Pebble Beach (1989)
Shooting Range (1989)
Dusty Diamond's All-Star Softball (1989)
Terao no Dosukoi Ōzumō (1989)
Short Order / Eggsplode! (1989)
Akuma-kun: Makai no Wana (1990)
Bases Loaded 3 (1990)
NES Play Action Football (1990)
Frankenstein: The Monster Returns (1991)
Bases Loaded 4 (1991)
Golf Grand Slam (1991)
Toxic Crusaders (1992, NES only)
Legends of the Diamond (1992, NES only)
Yoshi's Cookie (1992, NES & Game Boy only)
Tetris 2 (1993 video game) (1993, NES & Game Boy only)
Rokudenashi Blues (1993)
Dragon Ball Z Gaiden: Saiya-jin Zetsumetsu Keikaku (1993)
Battle Rush: Build Up Robot Tournament (1993)
Pro Sport Hockey (1993)
Crayon Shin-Chan: Ora to Poi Poi (1993)
J. League Super Top Players (1994)

Famicom Disk System 

 Famicom Tantei Club: Kieta Kōkeisha (1988)

Super Famicom/Super NES
Super Tennis (1991)
Super Bases Loaded (1991)
Goal! (1992)
Dig & Spike Volleyball (1992)
Super Professional Baseball II (1992)
Super Play Action Football (1992, Super NES only)
Bazooka Blitzkrieg (1992)
Super Bases Loaded 2 (1993)
Super Goal! 2 (1993)
Namco Open (1993)
Rokudenashi Blues (1994)
Hana no Keiji: Kumo no Kanata ni (1994)
Takeda Nobuhiro no Super League Soccer (1994)
Super Bases Loaded 3 (1994)
Tetris 2 (1994)
Gon (1994)
Natsuki Crisis Battle (1995)
Sterling Sharpe: End 2 End (1995, Super NES only)
Dragon Ball Z: Super Saiya Densetsu (1992)
Dragon Ball Z: Super Butouden (1993)
Dragon Ball Z: Super Butouden 2 (1993)
Dragon Ball Z: Super Butouden 3 (1994)
Pro Sport Hockey (1994)
Dragon Ball Z: Chou Gokuu Den: Kakusei-hen (1995)
Dragon Ball Z: Chou Gokuu Den: Totsugeki-hen (1995)
Dragon Ball Z: Hyper Dimension (1996)

Game Boy
Boxing (1990)
Karakuri Kengou Den Musashi Lord (1991)
Kid Icarus: Of Myths and Monsters (1991)
Soccer (1991)
Yoshi's Cookie (1992, NES & Game Boy only)
Tetris 2 (1993, NES & Game Boy only)
Takeda Nobuhiro no Ace Striker (1994)
Kirby's Block Ball (1995)
Arcade Classic No. 3: Galaga/Galaxian (1995)
Game Boy Gallery (1995)
Sports Collection (1996)
Namco Gallery Vol. 1 (1996)
Namco Gallery Vol. 2 (1996)
Namco Gallery Vol. 3 (1997)
Game & Watch Gallery (1997)

Game Boy Color
Dragon Warrior Monsters (1998)
Game & Watch Gallery 2 (1998)
Game & Watch Gallery 3 (1999)
Dragon Warrior I & II (1999)
Metal Gear: Ghost Babel (2000)
Winnie the Pooh: Adventures in the 100 Acre Wood (2000)
Dragon Warrior III (2000)
Dragon Warrior Monsters 2 (2001)

Game Boy Advance
Densetsu no Stafy (2002)
Shrek: Hassle at the Castle (2002)
Game & Watch Gallery 4 (2002)
Densetsu no Stafy 2 (2003)
Dragon Quest Monsters: Caravan Heart (2003)
Shrek: Reekin' Havoc (2003)
Slime MoriMori Dragon Quest: Shōgeki no Shippo Dan (2003)
Densetsu no Stafy 3 (2004)
The Nightmare Before Christmas: The Pumpkin King (2005)

Virtual Boy 
Mario's Tennis (1995)

PlayStation
Theme Aquarium (1998)
Thousand Arms (1998)
Shin Megami Tensei: Devil Summoner: Soul Hackers (1998) 
Resident Evil Survivor (2000)
Bass Landing (2000)
Bass Landing 2 (2001)

PlayStation 2
The King of Route 66 (co-developed with Sega-AM2, 2003)
Code of the Samurai (co-developed with Red Entertainment)

GameCube
Resident Evil Zero (2002)

PlayStation 3
Lightning Returns: Final Fantasy XIII (co-developed with Square Enix and tri-Ace, 2013)

PlayStation 4
World of Final Fantasy (co-developed with Square Enix, 2016)
The King of Fighters XIV (co-developed with SNK, 2016)
Scarlet Nexus (co-developed with Bandai Namco Entertainment, 2021)
Crisis Core: Final Fantasy VII Reunion (co-developed with Square Enix, 2022)

PlayStation 5
Scarlet Nexus (co-developed with Bandai Namco Entertainment, 2021)
Crisis Core: Final Fantasy VII Reunion (co-developed with Square Enix, 2022)

PlayStation Portable
Valkyrie Profile: Lenneth (2006)
Ultimate Ghosts'n Goblins (2006)
Star Ocean: First Departure (2007)
Star Ocean: Second Evolution (2008)

PlayStation Vita
World of Final Fantasy (co-developed with Square Enix, 2016)

Nintendo DS
Naruto RPG 2: Chidori vs. Rasengan (2005)
Super Princess Peach (2005)
Dragon Quest Heroes: Rocket Slime (2005)
Sega Casino (2005)
Avatar: The Last Airbender (2006)
Densetsu no Stafy 4 (2006)
Dragon Quest Monsters: Joker (2006)
Naruto: Path of the Ninja 2 (2006)
MySims (2007)
Avatar: The Last Airbender – The Burning Earth (2007)
Naruto Shippūden: Dairansen! Kage Bunshin Emaki (2008)
MySims Kingdom (2008)
Ragnarok DS (2008)
Crash: Mind Over Mutant (2008)
The Legendary Starfy (2008)
WWE SmackDown vs. Raw 2009 (2008)
WWE SmackDown vs. Raw 2010 (2009)
MySims Agents (2009)
Dragon Quest Monsters: Joker 2 (2010)
Planes (2013)
Tetris DS (unreleased)

Nintendo 3DS
Resident Evil: The Mercenaries 3D (2011)
Slime Mori Mori Dragon Quest 3 (2011)
Resident Evil: Revelations (2012)
Dragon Quest Monsters: Terry's Wonderland 3D (2012)
Planes (2013)
Dragon Quest Monsters 2: Iru and Luca's Marvelous Mysterious Key (2014)
Fire Emblem Fates (castle modeling support for Intelligent Systems, 2015)
Dragon Quest Monsters: Joker 3 (2016)
WarioWare Gold (2018)

Wii U 
Paper Mario Color Splash (environment art support for Intelligent Systems, 2016)

Nintendo Switch 
Splatoon 2 (2017)
Paper Mario: The Origami King (2020)
Famicom Detective Club: The Missing Heir (Remake) (2021)
WarioWare: Get It Together! (Co-developed with Intelligent Systems, 2021)
Dragon Quest Treasures (Co-developed with Square Enix, 2022)
Crisis Core: Final Fantasy VII Reunion (co-developed with Square Enix, 2022)

Dreamcast 
Resident Evil – Code: Veronica (2000)

PC
GONG! Online (2007)

Android, iOS 

 Fight League (2017)
 Nijigasaki High School Idol Club TOKIMEKI RunRuns (2022)

Games ported by Tose 
Tose has ported a few games, including Square and Enix games for the Nintendo Entertainment System and Super NES.

Chrono Trigger (PlayStation, Nintendo DS)
 Front Mission (Nintendo DS)
Final Fantasy Origins and Final Fantasy I & II: Dawn of Souls (ports of Final Fantasy I & II for the PlayStation and Game Boy Advance, respectively)
Final Fantasy IV (PlayStation, Game Boy Advance)
Final Fantasy V (PlayStation, Game Boy Advance)
Final Fantasy VI (PlayStation, Game Boy Advance)
Valkyrie Profile: Lenneth (PlayStation Portable)
Final Fantasy Tactics: The War of the Lions (PlayStation Portable)
Star Ocean: First Departure (PlayStation Portable)
Star Ocean: Second Evolution (PlayStation Portable)
Resident Evil Revelations HD (Windows, PlayStation 3, Wii U, Xbox 360)
Ōkami (Wii, co-developed with Ready At Dawn)
2002 FIFA World Cup (GameCube, co-developed with EA Canada, Acclaim Studios Manchester, and Intelligent Games)
Metal Gear Solid (Windows port)
Dead Rising: Chop Till You Drop (port of Dead Rising for Wii)
The Legend of Zelda: Breath of the Wild (Nintendo Switch port)

Notes

References

External links

Amusement companies of Japan
Companies based in Kyoto
Companies listed on the Tokyo Stock Exchange
Nintendo divisions and subsidiaries
Video game companies of Japan
Video game development companies
Video game companies established in 1979
Japanese companies established in 1979